These are the Billboard Hot Dance Club Play and Singles Sales number-one hits of 2006.

See also
List of number-one dance airplay hits of 2006 (U.S.)
2006 in music
List of number-one dance hits (United States)
List of artists who reached number one on the U.S. Dance chart

References

2006
United States Dance Singles
2006 in American music